Neosichuanoceras is an extinct genus of actively mobile carnivorous cephalopod, essentially a Nautiloid, that lived in what would be Asia during the Silurian from 436.0—428.2 mya, existing for approximately .

Taxonomy
Neosichuanoceras was named by Flower (1958). It was assigned to Endocerida by Teichert et al. (1964); and to Orthocerida by Frey (1981).

Morphology
The shell is usually long, and may be straight ("orthoconic") or gently curved.  In life, these animals may have been similar to the modern squid, except for the long shell.

Fossil distribution
Fossil distribution is exclusive to Central China.

References

Prehistoric nautiloid genera
Silurian animals
Silurian extinctions
Silurian animals of Asia